Cordell & Cordell, P.C. is an international domestic litigation firm based in Saint Louis, Missouri, USA, that is frequently cited as the largest men's divorce law firm in the country  with more than 150 offices and 300 attorneys in 45 states and two countries. The growth has been rapid: in 2002, the firm had just three offices in two states.

The Wall Street Journal has described the firm as "among the most ambitious of a breed of law firms that has emerged to capitalize on the fathers' rights movement, which believes that courts slight men in divorce and especially in child custody cases."

Legal practice 

The law firm exclusively practices family law and primarily focuses on representing men and fathers' rights. Cordell and Cordell has "carved out a niche in cities across the country by almost exclusively representing men in divorce and custody settlements," according to The Cincinnati Enquirer.

Divorce resources 

As part of the firm's outreach efforts, Cordell & Cordell operates a network of online properties designed to offer additional divorce resources and information to men going through divorce. In its profile of the firm in the article "Lawyers Carve Out Divorce For Men Niche," The Wall Street Journal cited several of these websites and their featured articles as striking a chord with men wary of a court system predisposed against them.

History 

Cordell & Cordell was founded in 1990 by Joseph Cordell and his wife, Yvonne. What began as a general practice firm evolved into focusing on representing men in divorce and custody cases when the Cordells noticed the challenges consistently facing men when it came to issues of custody, alimony, and domestic violence accusations.

In 2001, the firm expanded into Kansas City, added Atlanta in 2004, Indianapolis in 2005, Dallas and Chicago in 2006, and eventually has worked its way into most major cities.

In May 2015, the firm expanded to the United Kingdom and opened its first office in Central London.

Co-founder Joseph Cordell commented on the launch: "Men are still unfairly represented in family courts in the UK. We recognized the need to provide a better service back in 1990 in the US, so it's great to expand the business and help more fathers, dads, and husbands in need of advice and representation."

Client-centered approach 

In a feature piece on Cordell & Cordell, The Cincinnati Enquirer outlined several reasons for the booming growth the firm has experienced, including how its unique customer service practices are notable to the legal profession.  The article explained that Cordell & Cordell reviews social media profiles, communication between couples, and other sources as part of their background information gathering efforts.

The Enquirer described how Cordell & Cordell's client care division is responsible for gauging client satisfaction throughout the divorce process. The law firm also uses a metric system to rate client satisfaction and promotes and rewards its lawyers based on these metrics.

Media coverage 

The firm's business practices have been featured nationally in print by outlets such as The New York Times , The Wall Street Journal, USA Today and Time magazine; on TV with appearances on Fox & Friends; on radio with guest spots on Bloomberg Radio, Yahoo! Sports Radio, Money Radio and Fox News Radio; and online by CNN, Business Insider and The Huffington Post.

Notable topics of interviews include:
 Do men need extra legal protection in divorce court? (video) - Fox & Friends
 Dying Spouses and Divorce - Time magazine 
 Facebook and Divorce: Airing The Dirty Laundry
 Economy prolongs some marriages, ends others - CNN
 More Men Are Winning Battles In Divorce Court Today - Business Insider
 How To Handle Divorce: The Custody Bias - MensHealth.com
 Divorce Advice Columns for HuffingtonPost.com - The Huffington Post
 More Dads Demand Equal Custody Rights - USA Today 
 Lawyers Carve Out 'Divorce for Men' Niche - The Wall Street Journal
 BBC Radio 4 Interview Cordell & Cordell - BBC Radio 4
 Economy prolongs some marriages, ends others - CNN
 Meet the divorce lawyers standing up for dads' rights - Telegraph
 Major US divorce firm lands in UK with ambitions to dominate the market - Legal Futures

References 

Law firms based in St. Louis
Law firms established in 1990
1990 establishments in Missouri